Doorndraai Dam is a buttress type dam on the Sterk River, Mogalakwena River basin, located near Mokopane, Limpopo, South Africa. It was established in 1952 and has been renovated in 1974. Its primary purpose is for municipal and industrial use. The hazard potential is ranked to be high.

See also
List of reservoirs and dams in South Africa
List of rivers of South Africa

References 

 List of South African Dams from the Department of Water Affairs and Forestry (South Africa)

Mogalakwena River
Dams in South Africa
Dams completed in 1952